Eccritosia is a genus of robber flies in the family Asilidae. There are about seven described species in Eccritosia.

Species
These seven species belong to the genus Eccritosia:
 Eccritosia amphinome (Walker, 1849) c g
 Eccritosia antidomus (Walker, 1849) c g
 Eccritosia barbata (Fabricius, 1787) c
 Eccritosia plinthopyga (Wiedemann, 1821) c g
 Eccritosia rubriventris (Macquart, 1850) c g
 Eccritosia wirthi Paramonov, 1964 c g
 Eccritosia zamon (Townsend, 1895) i c g b
Data sources: i = ITIS, c = Catalogue of Life, g = GBIF, b = Bugguide.net

References

Further reading

 
 
 

Asilinae
Asilidae genera
Articles created by Qbugbot